This list includes commanders of the Third Army of Turkey, who were, in their time of service, nominal heads of the Third Army, one of the four field armies of the Turkish Land Forces.

The current Commander of the Third Army is Lieutenant general Şeref Öngay, since 22 August 2019.

See also 
 Chief of the Turkish General Staff
 List of commanders of the Turkish Land Forces

References

Commanders of the Third Army
Commanders of Third Army